The 6th Asian Cross Country Championships took place 2001 in Kathmandu, Nepal. Team rankings were decided by a combination of each nation's top three athletes finishing positions.

Medalists

Medal table

References
Results

Asian Cross Country Championships
Asian Cross Country
Asian Cross Country
Asian Cross Country
Sport in Kathmandu
International athletics competitions hosted by Nepal